Redhills is the headquarters building of the Durham Miners' Association (DMA) in Durham, England. Officially called Miners' New Hall, it is known as Redhills from its location on Redhills Lane in the City of Durham.

Redhills was designed by H. T. Gradon in Edwardian Baroque style and opened in 1915 to replace the former Miners' Hall building in North Road. Its debating chamber was known as the "Pitman's Parliament".

In March 2020 the National Lottery Heritage Fund awarded a £4 million grant for restoration and renovation work, with the aim of restoring Redhills as a community and arts centre. In October 2021, as part of the grant agreement, Durham Miners Association transferred ownership of the site to the Redhills Charitable Incorporated Organisation. As of 2022, restoration and renovation works are underway.

The site is used by a number of organisations, including the Durham School of English.

The main building houses the office of local Labour MP Mary Foy. In May 2022, Labour leader Keir Starmer was accused of having broken COVID-19 pandemic legal restrictions at the venue the previous April, by drinking beer and eating takeaway food in a room there with other party members present. This became known as "Beergate".

See also
Durham Miners' Gala
Durham Mining Museum
Miners' Federation of Great Britain

References

External links

The Miners' Hall Centenary Celebrations 2015 Souvenir Booklet

Buildings and structures completed in the 20th century
Buildings and structures in Durham, England
Grade II listed buildings in County Durham
History of mining in the United Kingdom